Brevundimonas naejangsanensis is a Gram-negative, rod-shaped and motile bacterium from the genus of Brevundimonas which has been isolated from soil from Korea.

References

Bacteria described in 2009
Caulobacterales